Adriaan Erasmus 'Meel' Engelbrecht (born 14 September 1990) is a former South African rugby union player, that spent his entire career at the . His regular position was fly-half or centre.

He retired from rugby union prior to the 2016 season.

Career

Youth

Senior career

He played in the Under-21 Provincial Championship in the rest of the season, but made his return to the senior side in the 2012 Vodacom Cup, scoring four tries and made twelve starts in the 2012 Currie Cup First Division season.

He was a member of the  team that won the 2015 Currie Cup First Division. He featured in a total of thirteen matches during the 2015 Currie Cup qualification rounds and First Division proper and was the Leopards' top scorer, contributing 147 points for the side.

In 2013, he was included in a South Africa President's XV team that played in the 2013 IRB Tbilisi Cup and won the tournament after winning all three matches.

References

South African rugby union players
Living people
1990 births
Rugby union players from Pretoria
Leopards (rugby union) players
Rugby union centres
Rugby union fly-halves